General elections were held in Saint Kitts-Nevis-Anguilla on 6 October 1952, the country's first elections held with universal suffrage. The Workers' League won seven of the eight elected seats.

Background
The previous elections had taken place in 1946, and the next elections were due in 1949. However, they were postponed each year until 1952.

A new constitution introduced in 1952 provided for a 14-member Legislative Council, consisting of eight elected members, the Governor (as President of the Council), two ex officio members and three appointed members.

Results

References

Saint Kitts
Elections in Saint Kitts and Nevis
1952 in Saint Kitts-Nevis-Anguilla
October 1952 events in North America
Saint Kitts